Donovan Drayton is the son of guitarist Ronny Drayton. Drayton came into the spotlight when attention was drawn to what his father claims is a wrongful incarceration with no valid trial or charges. On July 25, 2013, Drayton was acquitted of all but one charge, possession of a weapon.

On January 4, 2012, the bands Living Colour and 24-7 Spyz played together for the first time at a benefit for Donovan Drayton's defense called The Million Man Mosh, organized by his father, Ronny Drayton. Michael Hampton also appeared at this benefit. According to Greg Tate, "Whatever lingering doubt some may have had about Donovan’s innocence was forever dispelled by the fact that Donovan, alone among those charged in the case, refused to accept a plea deal…This despite the fact that he risked maximum sentences while those who confessed to planning and executing the crime were given minimum terms of incarceration." On January 4, 2013, a second Million Man Mosh was held, which featured Living Colour, 24-7 Spyz, and Burnt Sugar.

In March, 2013, the 4Donovan website put together a benefit album to raise money for Donovan's defense funds. All of the proceeds, after PayPal deductions, go directly to Ronny Drayton. The album features performances by Burnt Sugar, The Veldt, Leon Gruenbaum, Gene Williams, Jane Getter, The Family Stand, Ronny Drayton, Paula Henderson aka Secretary, Ajaxpark, David Gilmore, Honey Ear Trio, Mark Lesseraux, Micah Gaugh, Joe Bowie, Stephanie Rooker, No Image, Asa Lovechild, Manguss, Les July, The Rewd Onez, The Sweet Fuzzy Itsy Bitsy, D-Xtreme, Baba Yaga, Throwdown Syndicate, The Freeman Brothers, Suga Bush, Alex Lozupone with Pain Hertz, Darquematta, Divine Pocket Bouncers, Dope Sagittarius with Mazzmuse, Ted Stilles, Ben Tyree, Marc Edwards & Slipstream Time Travel, Tommy O, Devi, and Marque Gilmore.

References

Year of birth missing (living people)
Living people
Prisoners and detainees of New York (state)
American prisoners and detainees